Gonatodes castanae, Castaño's gecko, is a species of lizard in the Sphaerodactylidae family found in Colombia.

References

Gonatodes
Reptiles described in 2020
Reptiles of Colombia